The 2017 Active Pest Control 200 was the second stock car race of the 2017 NASCAR Camping World Truck Series and the ninth iteration of the event. The race was held on Saturday, March 4, 2017, in Hampton, Georgia at Atlanta Motor Speedway, a 1.54 miles (2.48 km) permanent asphalt quad-oval intermediate speedway. The race took the scheduled 130 laps to complete. At race's end, Christopher Bell, driving for Kyle Busch Motorsports, would defend the field on a restart with two to go to complete a dominant performance for the race and secure a win. The win was Bell's third career NASCAR Camping World Truck Series win and his first of the season. To fill out the podium, Matt Crafton of ThorSport Racing and Johnny Sauter of GMS Racing would finish second and third, respectively.

Background 

Atlanta Motor Speedway (formerly Atlanta International Raceway) is a track in Hampton, Georgia, 20 miles (32 km) south of Atlanta. It is a 1.54-mile (2.48 km) quad-oval track with a seating capacity of 111,000. It opened in 1960 as a 1.5-mile (2.4 km) standard oval. In 1994, 46 condominiums were built over the northeastern side of the track. In 1997, to standardize the track with Speedway Motorsports' other two 1.5-mile (2.4 km) ovals, the entire track was almost completely rebuilt. The frontstretch and backstretch were swapped, and the configuration of the track was changed from oval to quad-oval. The project made the track one of the fastest on the NASCAR circuit.

Entry list 

 (R) denotes rookie driver.
 (i) denotes driver who is ineligible for series driver points.

*Withdrew.

Practice

First practice 
The first practice session was held on Friday, March 3, at 11:00 AM EST, and would last for 55 minutes.

Second practice 
The second practice session was held on Friday, March 3, at 2:30 PM EST, and would last for 55 minutes.

Third and final practice 
The third and final practice session, sometimes referred to as Happy Hour, was held on Friday, March 3, at 4:30 PM EST, and would last for 55 minutes.

Qualifying 
Qualifying was held on Saturday, March 4, at 10:40 AM EST. Since Atlanta Motor Speedway is at least a 1.5 miles (2.4 km) racetrack, the qualifying system was a single car, single lap, two round system where in the first round, everyone would set a time to determine positions 13–32. Then, the fastest 12 qualifiers would move on to the second round to determine positions 1–12.

Three drivers would fail to qualify: J. J. Yeley, Norm Benning, and Jennifer Jo Cobb.

Full qualifying results

Race results 
Stage 1 Laps: 40

Stage 2 Laps: 40

Stage 3 Laps: 50

Standings after the race 

Drivers' Championship standings

Note: Only the first 8 positions are included for the driver standings.

References 

2017 NASCAR Camping World Truck Series
NASCAR races at Atlanta Motor Speedway
March 2017 sports events in the United States
2017 in sports in Georgia (U.S. state)